Randall Louis Young (born July 4, 1954) is a former American football offensive lineman who played in the National Football League (NFL) for the Tampa Bay Buccaneers in 1976. He attended Carol City High School and then Iowa State University before being drafted by the Miami Dolphins in the 12th round, 338th overall, in the 1976 NFL Draft.

References

Living people
1954 births
Tampa Bay Buccaneers players
American football offensive tackles
Iowa State Cyclones football players